Cheonghwasan is a South Korean mountain between the county of Goesan, Chungcheongbuk-do and the city of Sangju, Gyeongsangbuk-do.

See also
List of mountains in Korea

References

 
 

Mountains of North Gyeongsang Province
Mountains of North Chungcheong Province
Sangju
Mungyeong
Goesan County
Mountains of South Korea